Yanghe Township is a rural township in Cili County, Hunan Province, People's Republic of China.

Administrative division
The township is divided into 16 villages, the following areas: Jiashi Village, Dafang Village, Zhaiyu Village, Zhujiazui Village, Shuangping Village, Yufu Village, Guanfang Village, Taoxi Village, Sanxi Village, Changling Village, Liziping Village, Daijiashan Village, Yangjiaping Village, Zhenjiaping Village, Qifangyu Village, and Fengyu Village (甲石村、大坊村、寨峪村、朱家嘴村、双坪村、渔浦村、官坊村、桃溪村、三溪村、长岭村、梨子坪村、戴家山村、杨家坪村、甄家坪村、七方峪村、凤渔村).

References

Divisions of Cili County
Ethnic townships of the People's Republic of China